Chen Ruoxuan (born 16 October 1994) is a Chinese actor. He is best known for his roles in Novoland: The Castle in the Sky and Evil Minds.

Early life
Chen was born on October 16, 1994, in Zibo, Shandong Province. He graduated from the Central Academy of Drama.

Career
Chen Ruoxuan made his acting debut in the shenmo television series The Investiture of the Gods 2. 
Thereafter he took the lead role in the crime web series Evil Minds, based on the novel of the same name by Lei Mi. The series was a modest success with 530 million views.

In 2016, Chen played one of the lead roles in the segment "Hu Si" of the shenmo drama Legend of Nine Tails Fox, and played a supporting role in the fantasy drama Novoland: The Castle in the Sky. In particular, his role as Yu Huanzhen in Novoland: The Castle in the Sky was well-received and led to increased recognition for him. He reprised his role as Fang Mu in the second season of the crime web series Evil Minds.

Branching out to different genres, Chen starred in the youth melodrama The Endless Love and the campus romance drama Beyond Light Years. He then starred in the fantasy epic drama  Novoland: Eagle Flag.

Filmography

Film

Television series

Awards and nominations

References

1994 births
Living people
21st-century Chinese male actors
Chinese male television actors
Male actors from Shandong
Central Academy of Drama alumni